Paul Marc Davis (born 16 April 1974) is a British actor who has appeared on Doctor Who (the episode "Utopia") and three of its spin-off series: Torchwood ("Exit Wounds"), The Sarah Jane Adventures (as recurring villain "The Trickster"), and Class  (as recurring villain Corakinus). This makes him the only actor to appear in all four of the Doctor Who series. He was also an executive producer on Sports Day 3D.

Life and career
Davis was born in London. He studied Fine Art and was a professional Sculptor for 12 years.

He is best known for his design of the Gramophone International Classical Music Award, an award regarded as the highest accolade for Classical Music and has Luciano Pavarotti among its recipients. Paul was awarded The Association of British Artists Award for Sculpture in 1996 and was shortlisted for The National association of British Sculptors award in 1998.

In 2001, after a chance meeting, he was offered the lead in a Channel Four film about the life of Casanova. In the same year he played the ghost of the Cavalier in Harry Potter and the Philosopher’s Stone. Over the next few years Davis played leads in many independent films and in 2007 was cast in Doctor Who, The Sarah Jane Adventures and Torchwood.  Other roles include playing alongside Colin Farrell in Woody Allen's Cassandra's Dream.

Filmography

Film

Television

References

External links
 

1974 births
English male film actors
English male television actors
Living people